Lieutenant General Trần Ngọc Tám was an officer of the Army of the Republic of Vietnam.

He served as the commander of II Corps, which oversaw the Central Highlands region, from 1 October 1957 until 13 August of the next year, when he was replaced by Major General Tôn Thất Đính. He was the first commander of II Corps. He served as the commander of III Corps, which oversaw the region of the country surrounding Saigon from 4 April 1964 until 12 October of the same year, when he was replaced by Major General Cao Văn Viên.

Tám later served as Chairman of the Free World Military Assistance Organisation.

Notes

References

Army of the Republic of Vietnam generals
Year of birth missing
Place of birth missing
Possibly living people